Sigismondo Gonzaga (1469, Mantua – 3 October 1525, Mantua) was an Italian cardinal. He was the third son of Federico I Gonzaga, Marquess of Mantua.

Life 

He was the son of Frederick I of Mantua and commanded his brother Francesco II's troops before beginning his ecclesiastical career. He became apostolic protonotary. Pope Julius II was made a cardinal in the consistory of 1 December 1505. He was made apostolic administrator of Mantua from 1511 to 1521, finally resigning the post in favour of his nephew Ercole. He gained much sympathy from the schismatic cardinals but remained faithful to Julius II.

He became apostolic legate to Bologna in 1511 and 1512 and legate to the March of Ancona and Mantua. He took part in the 1513 conclave which elected pope Leo X, that of 1521-22 that elected pope Hadrian VI and that of 1523 that elected pope Clement VII. He ended his career as administrator of Aversa at the start of 1524. He was the great-uncle of cardinals Francesco Gonzaga (1561) and Giovanni Vincenzo Gonzaga (1578). Other cardinals in the family were Francesco Gonzaga (1461), Pirro Gonzaga (1527), Scipione Gonzaga (1587), Ferdinando Gonzaga (1607) and Vincenzo Gonzaga (1615).

References

1469 births
1525 deaths
16th-century Italian cardinals
Sigismondo
Bishops of Aversa